Acupalpus angulosus is an insect-eating ground beetle of the genus Acupalpus.

References 

angulosus
Beetles described in 1998